Group 3 consisted of four of the 32 teams entered into the European zone: Austria, East Germany, Malta, and Turkey. These four teams competed on a home-and-away basis for one of the 8.5 spots in the final tournament allocated to the European zone. The spot would be assigned to the group's winner.

Standings

Matches

Notes

External links 
Group 3 Detailed Results at RSSSF

3
1976–77 in Austrian football
1977–78 in Austrian football
1976–77 in East German football
1977–78 in East German football
1976–77 in Maltese football
1977–78 in Maltese football
1976–77 in Turkish football
1977–78 in Turkish football